Block Bay is a long ice-filled bay lying east of Guest Peninsula along the coast of Marie Byrd Land. It was discovered in 1929 by the Byrd Antarctic Expedition, and named by Richard E. Byrd for Paul Block, newspaper publisher and patron of the expedition.

Features
 Adams Rocks - which overlook the inner part of the bay

References
 

Bays of Marie Byrd Land